Nam Kum is a subdistrict in the Nakhon Thai District of Phitsanulok Province, Thailand.

Geography
Nam Kum is the northernmost subdistrict in Nakhon Thai. It is bordered to the northwest by Chat Trakan District, to the east by Loei Province, and to the south by Nakhon Chum. The subdistrict is primarily mountainous terrain, as it is in the Phetchabun Mountains.
Nam Kum lies in the Nan Basin, which is part of the Chao Phraya Watershed.

Administration
The following is a list of the subdistrict's mubans (villages):

Temples
Nam Kum is home to the following two temples:
Wat Pho Sai in Ban Nam Kun
Wat Pho Tharam in Ban Na Faek

References

Tambon of Phitsanulok province
Populated places in Phitsanulok province